Swastika is an unincorporated community in the town of Black Brook, Clinton County, New York,  United States. The community is 19 miles southwest of Plattsburgh. Like Swastika, Ontario, the community is commonly included on unusual place names lists because of its name.

History

A post office called Swastika, NY operated from 1913 until 1958.  Edward Duprey, the town's last postmaster, told the Plattsburgh Press-Republican that the community was "previously known as Goodrich Mills."  "The government sent a list of names," he explained of Swastika's origin.  "It had nothing to do with the community.  It was just a name for the post office", he added.

In September 2020, the town's councilors unanimously voted to keep the name despite the word's modern associations.

References

Hamlets in Clinton County, New York
Hamlets in New York (state)